The 2018 Puerto Rico Soccer League season would be the 10th season as Puerto Rico's top-division football league.

League News
On November 3rd, the PRSL began its first several missions of humanitarian aid from Houston and Fort Lauderdale arriving at Isla Grande Airport with some medical supplies. Two weeks later after several missions of transporting supplies to the island and transport a cancer patient to the city of Houston to receive a bone marrow transplant operation, the PRSL president Joseph "Joey" Serralta, announced the creation of the Joe Serralta Foundation after partnering with the city of Houston to provide humanitarian and philanthropic services that will include special projects in areas of disaster and low resources with great deficiencies and basic needs.

Teams and personnel

Teams

Managerial changes

References

Puerto Rico Soccer League seasons
2017 in Puerto Rican football